Top Cats is a Swedish rockabilly band formed Torsby in 2001. The earliest line-up was made up of Jon Kleppenes (as lead singer), Daniel Kjellberg (drummer), Henrik Törnevik (contrabass), Fredrik Lilja (guitar), Olle Sätterström (guitar, trumpet, piano), Erica Larsson and Sandra Zackrisson (both backing vocals). When in 2004 drummer Daniel Kjellberg left, he was replaced by Robert Jansson. In 2007, double bassist Henrik Törnevik left and was replaced by Martin Lindahl.

The band took part in Melodifestivalen 2012 with "Baby Doll" written by Mårten Eriksson, Lina Eriksson and Susie Päivärinta and made it to the final after winning a spot from the "second chance" round alongside Thorsten Flinck & Revolutionsorkestern.  In the final they finished in sixth place.

In 2015 Top Cats started their own record label TC entertainment.  

At the new label, Top Cats released the Kick Down record that was recorded in King's side studio in Gnesta.

Two years later, the band released its first EP "in the middle of the night", which was partly recorded in the band's private studio, located in a barn in northern Värmland.

New music is recorded in 2018 and as the first single, Piece of my Heart was released in June.

Discography

Albums

Singles

References

External links 

 
 

Swedish musical groups
2001 establishments in Sweden
Musical groups established in 2001
Rockabilly music groups
Melodifestivalen contestants of 2012